Adebayo Adigun (born 15 November 1990) is a Nigerian former football player.

Adigun began his career with Shooting Stars F.C. and signed on 6 December 2009 a three years contract with the J1 League club Kashiwa Reysol.
Adebayo Adigun retired from football in 2017.

Personal life
He is the son of the former international Bunmi Adigun.

References

External links
 

1990 births
Living people
Nigerian footballers
Nigerian expatriate footballers
Nigerian expatriate sportspeople in Japan
Expatriate footballers in Japan
J1 League players
J2 League players
Kashiwa Reysol players
Sunshine Stars F.C. players

Tokyo Verdy players
Yoruba sportspeople
Association football defenders
Sportspeople from Ibadan